Information World Review was an English monthly trade magazine covering the information industry. Established in 1976, it was initially published by Learned Information Ltd and subsequently by VNU Business Publications and finally by Bizmedia Ltd. under license from Incisive Media. The magazine was initially headquartered in Oxford before subsequently moving to London.

References

External links
 VNU Business Media Europe Print Brands

1976 establishments in the United Kingdom
Business magazines published in the United Kingdom
English-language magazines
Magazines established in 1976
Magazines published in London
Mass media in Oxford
Monthly magazines published in the United Kingdom
Professional and trade magazines